Daniel Carroll (July 22, 1730May 7, 1796) was an American politician and plantation owner from Maryland and one of the Founding Fathers of the United States. He supported the American Revolution, served in the Confederation Congress, was a delegate to the Philadelphia Convention of 1787 which penned the Constitution of the United States, and was a U.S. Representative in the First Congress. Carroll was one of five men to sign both the Articles of Confederation and the Constitution. He was one of the few Roman Catholics among the Founders.

Early life

Carroll was born in Marlborough Town in the Province of Maryland on July 22, 1730. He was the son of wealthy planters Daniel Carroll (c.1696 - 1751) and Eleanor Darnall Carroll (1703 - 1796). His parents' home was Darnall's Chance, a plantation of 27,000 acres which his mother had inherited from her grandfather. Carroll was sent abroad for his education. Between 1742 and 1748 he studied under the Jesuits at the College of St. Omer in France, established for the education of English Catholics. Then, after a tour of Europe, he sailed home and soon married Eleanor Carroll, apparently a first cousin, whose grandparents were Daniel O'Caroll and Dorothy Kennedy from Ireland.

His younger brother John was the first Roman Catholic bishop in the United States (as Bishop of Baltimore, 1790) and founder of Georgetown University; his cousin Charles Carroll of Carrollton signed the Declaration of Independence.

Career
In the 1770s, Carroll gradually joined the Patriot cause. As a slaveholder and large landholder, he was initially concerned that the Revolution might fail economically and bring about his family's financial ruin and mob rule.

At the time, Maryland, though Catholic-founded, had (like the rest of the Thirteen Colonies) issued laws excluding Roman Catholics from holding public office. When Maryland declared its independence from the Crown and enacted its first constitution, these laws were nullified. Carroll was elected to the Maryland Senate, serving 1777–1781. As a state senator, he helped raise troops and money for the American cause. His involvement in the Revolutionary War, like that of other Patriots in his extended family, was inspired by the family's motto: "Strong in Faith and War".

He led the effort to block the State Assembly from ratifying of the Articles of Confederation until the states that had western land claims (which Maryland did not) ceded those claims to Congress. Carroll dropped his opposition only after Virginia relinquished its claims on land north of the Ohio River to Congress, and on February 2, 1781, Maryland became the thirteenth and final state to ratify the Articles.

Constitutional Convention of 1787

In 1787, Carroll was named a Maryland delegate to the Philadelphia Convention, which convened to revise the Articles, and produced the Constitution. Like his good friend James Madison of Virginia, Carroll was convinced that a strong central government was needed to regulate commerce among the states and with other nations. He also spoke out repeatedly in opposition to the payment of members of the United States Congress by the states, reasoning that such compensation would sabotage the strength of the new government because "the dependence of both Houses on the state Legislatures would be complete ... The new government in this form is nothing more than a second edition of [the Continental] Congress in two volumes, instead of one, and perhaps with very few amendments."

When it was suggested that the president (executive branch) should be elected by the Congress (legislative branch), Carroll, seconded by James Wilson, moved that the words "by the legislature" be replaced with "by the people". He and Thomas Fitzsimons were the only Roman Catholics to sign the Constitution, but their presence was a sign of the continued advancement of religious freedom in America. Carroll played an essential role in formulating the limitation of the powers of the federal or central government. He was the author of the presumption—enshrined in the Constitution as a closing article – that powers not specifically delegated to the federal government were reserved to the states or to the people. Carroll spoke about 20 times during the summer of debates at the Constitutional Convention and served on the Committee on Postponed Matters. Returning to Maryland after the convention, he campaigned for ratification of the Constitution but was not a delegate to the Maryland state convention for ratification.

Political career
Following the convention, Carroll continued to be involved in state and national affairs. He was a key participant in the Maryland ratification struggle of 1787–1788. He defended the Constitution in the "Maryland Journal", most notably in his response to the arguments advanced by the well-known Anti-Federalist and Patriot delegate Samuel Chase.  After ratification was achieved in Maryland, Carroll was elected as a representative ("congressman") to the Sixth Congressional District of Maryland to the First Congress of 1789, meeting in New York City. Given his concern for economic and fiscal stability, he voted for the assumption of state debts accumulated during the war by the federal government to establish a new level of financial confidence of credible public debts as proposed by Secretary of the Treasury Alexander Hamilton as part of a "grand bargain" with Secretary of State Thomas Jefferson, for Northerners to support locating the new national capital in the upper South, along the Potomac River.

One of three commissioners appointed to survey the newly designated District of Columbia and acquire land for the new federal capital in the District, Carroll was related to two major landowners whose land was acquired by the government, his brother-in-law Notley Young and nephew Daniel Carroll of Duddington. The United States Capitol was built on a wooded hill owned by his nephew. As one of his first official acts as commissioner, on April 15, 1791, he and fellow commissioner David Stuart of Virginia laid the cornerstone for the beginning boundary line survey of the District at Jones Point, on the south bank of the Potomac near Alexandria, formerly in Virginia. He served as a commissioner until 1795, when he retired because of poor health.

He later was again elected to the Maryland Senate. He had many interests in his state and region, including the "Patowmack Company", which sought to build a Patowmack Canal to the West. This was a long-time project of George Washington since his western explorations and military campaigns against the French. This predated the survey and construction thirty years later of the Chesapeake and Ohio Canal.

Carroll died May 7, 1796, at age 65, at his home near Rock Creek in the present neighborhood of Forest Glen, Maryland. Carroll's body was buried there in Saint John the Evangelist Catholic Church Cemetery.

Legacy
Carroll Street in Madison, Wisconsin, is named in his honor.

References

Secondary sources

External links
 

1730 births
1796 deaths
Continental Congressmen from Maryland
18th-century American politicians
People educated at Stonyhurst College
Maryland state senators
Members of the United States House of Representatives from Maryland
People of Maryland in the American Revolution
Presidents of the Maryland State Senate
Signers of the Articles of Confederation
Signers of the United States Constitution
People from Upper Marlboro, Maryland
Daniel
American planters
Burials in Maryland
People from Forest Glen, Maryland
American slave owners
Catholics from Maryland
Founding Fathers of the United States